Massimo Bergami (born October 2, 1964) is a full professor of organizational behavior at the University of Bologna and dean of Bologna Business School.
He is married with Ludovica Leone and father of Giovanni Romano.

Massimo Bergami is a non-executive director at SNAM, Ferrarelle and a member of the Board of Trustees at EFMD. He also serves as Senior Advisor at the MAST Foundation and as Director of the Ferrari Corporate EMBA . He served as an independent Director at Ferretti Group, Ducati Motor Holding,  Brunello Cucinelli , Tuscia University, and Telecom Italia Media.
He has been a member of the Italian Panel of the 50 Best Restaurants of the World. His research and consulting activities are focused on creative industries such as Edutainment, Supercars, Design, Fashion, Food and Wine.

He has been an Advisor of the Ministry of Defence, Ministry of Industry, member of the "Commissione Cinema" (Film Commission) of the Ministry of Culture, Senior Economic Advisor of the Minister of Tourism and Member of the Committee for Natural Capital at the Ministry of Environment.

He has been appointed Guest Professor at Nankai University (Tianjin, China) and Honorary Professor at Mirbis (Moscow, Russia); in Italy has been awarded Cavaliere (Knight) al merito della Repubblica Italiana and Commendatore al merito della Repubblica Italiana

Books

References

1964 births
Living people
Academic staff of the University of Bologna